Yacine Amaouche (born June 26, 1979 in Amizour) is a former footballer. He last played as a forward for MSP Batna in the Algerian league.

Amaouche was a member of Algeria's squad at the 2000 African Cup of Nations, but did not play any matches at the tournament. He scored one international goal, which came against Uganda in 2002.

National team statistics

Honours
 Won the CAF Cup once in 2002 with JS Kabylie
 Won the Algerian league twice with JS Kabylie in 2004 and 2008
 Has 3 caps and 1 goal for the Algerian National Team

References

External links

1979 births
Living people
People from Amizour
Kabyle people
Algerian footballers
JS Kabylie players
Algeria international footballers
JSM Béjaïa players
2000 African Cup of Nations players
CA Batna players
MSP Batna players
Algerian Ligue 2 players
MO Béjaïa players
GC Mascara players
Association football midfielders
21st-century Algerian people